Lars Georg Granström (born 8 December 1942) is a Swedish former professional footballer who played the majority of his career at Malmö FF as a forward. He also played professionally in Germany at Karlsruher SC. He won one cap for the Sweden national team in 1965, scoring two goals.

Career statistics

International 

 Scores and results list Sweden's goal tally first, score column indicates score after each Granström goal.

References

External links

1942 births
Living people
Association football forwards
Swedish footballers
Allsvenskan players
Bundesliga players
Malmö FF players
Karlsruher SC players
Sweden international footballers
Sportspeople from Helsingborg